Cathrine Tuivaiti (née Latu; born 25 October 1986 in West Auckland, New Zealand) is a New Zealand netball player of Tongan, Samoan, and Māori descent.

Career

Early career
Cathrine Tuivaiti was a member of the New Zealand Secondary Schools and New Zealand U21 teams, and debuted in the National Bank Cup with the Northern Force in 2005. She continued with the team for a further two years, and remained in Auckland with the start of the ANZ Championship in 2008, playing for the new Northern Mystics franchise.

Northern Mystics
Playing for Northern Force as a teenager attracted the attention of people with Samoan netball contacts and, despite having little Samoan ancestry, Tuivaiti was invited to play at international level for Samoa, including playing for them in the 2007 Netball World Championships in Auckland. She also played in a World VII team in two tests series against New Zealand and Australia in 2009.

The Northern Mystics announced broad changes to their playing lineup for 2009 after a lacklustre first season in the ANZ Championship. Fijian international and former Silver Fern Vilimaina Davu was retained, while English shooter Pamela Cookey was also brought in as an import player. Tuivaiti was able to stay with the Mystics when Netball New Zealand gave her an exemption from being a third 'international' — and thus supposedly-'ineligible'-to-play for the Mystics — after she announced she would undertake a required four-year, international-representative stand-down period in order to be eligible for the Silver Ferns after 2011.

Tuivaiti remained with the Northern Mystics in 2010 and 2011, partnering in the shooting circle with Maria Tutaia. After completing her four-year stand down period, Tuivaiti was selected in the Silver Ferns Team in September 2011, and debuted against England in October.  New International rules precluded her playing for different countries in consecutive World Netball Championships so she was ineligible for 2011.

Tuivaiti signed with the Northern Mystics again for the 2012 season and was still signed with the SkyCity Mystics when she played her 100th [ANZ Championship?] match in mid-April 2015, against the Haier Pulse.

Silver Ferns
Tuivaiti was dropped from the Silver Ferns for the 2015 World Championships and due to it missed on the 2015 Constellation Cup, but was recalled to the 2016 squad.

Central Pulse and Adelaide Thunderbirds
Tuivaiti played for the Central Pulse for the 2017 season then signed to play for Adelaide Thunderbirds in 2018. However, she sustained an ACL injury two days later, ruling her out for most of the 2018 Australian Super League season. She made her debut for the side in the 10th Round against the Collingwood Magpies. Tuivaiti announced in a Facebook post on 31 December 2018 that she had had a second knee surgery.

For the 2019 season, Cathrine will be playing for the UWS Sirens competing in the UK wide Vitality Netball Superleague. She will also train with, and help prepare, the Gail Parata-led Scottish national team ahead of the 2019 Netball World Cup to be held in Liverpool, England, in July.

On 21 March 2019, she announced she was pregnant with her first child, ending her season with the Sirens and would be returning to New Zealand.

Controversy
In 2017, she accused NNZ of miscommunication and told the Radio Sport thatWhat disappoints the hell out of me is that I've had no communication. I've had no reason, to read that there were some off-court issues makes me out to be a bad guy. Yes, I have a foul mouth, but I'm a good person and I do as much as I can for my team-mates and for my country, of late. I don't really know what that's about, but I'm not happy about it. It's news to me and it really pisses me off the most.

References

External links
2016 Cathrine Tuivaiti Northern Mystics profile
2016 ANZ Championship profile

1986 births
Living people
Adelaide Thunderbirds players
ANZ Championship players
Australian Netball League players
Commonwealth Games medallists in netball
Commonwealth Games silver medallists for New Zealand
Netball players at the 2014 Commonwealth Games
Netball Superleague players
New Zealand expatriate netball people in Australia
New Zealand expatriate sportspeople in Scotland
New Zealand Māori netball players
New Zealand netball players
New Zealand sportspeople of Samoan descent
New Zealand sportspeople of Tongan descent
Northern Force players
Northern Mystics players
People educated at Massey High School
Samoan netball players
Sirens Netball players
Southern Force (netball) players
Sportspeople from the Auckland Region
Central Pulse players
New Zealand international Fast5 players
Medallists at the 2014 Commonwealth Games